Dead Man Weds is a six-part comedy series shown on ITV in Britain in January and early February 2005, and repeated on ITV2.

The series was written by Dave Spikey, who played the part of Jerry St Clair in Phoenix Nights. It was produced for ITV by the Red Production Company, and starred Spikey and Johnny Vegas.

The series concerns the staff of a fictional newspaper, The Fogburrow Advertiser, and the title of the series is a typical example of the paper's front-page headlines; Spikey saw the headline on a newspaper billboard about a man who had died but was resuscitated and then later married. The billboard did not have quote marks around the word dead, which made Spikey laugh and so he developed the sitcom from that headline.

In the series, a new editor, Gordon Garden (played by Spikey), is determined to shake up the newspaper. The acting editor, Lewis Donat (played by Vegas), is convinced that he should have been made editor himself, and believes that  journalism involves going on a break as soon as he gets in, stealing stories from old newspapers and getting the rest of the news from Joan at the cake shop, Cake That.

The series was filmed in several locations, notably Castleton in Derbyshire.

The theme music, also used as incidental music and stings throughout the series, is a version of Jonathan King's composition "It's Good News Week", which was a hit for Hedgehoppers Anonymous in 1965.

The production company has announced that the series will not be released on DVD because of problems obtaining copyright clearance for the music used.

References

External links

Red Production website

ITV sitcoms
2000s British sitcoms
2005 British television series debuts
2005 British television series endings
Television series by Red Production Company